Pelagodes is a genus of moths in the family Geometridae.

Species
Pelagodes antiquadraria (Inoue, 1976)
Pelagodes aucta (Prout, 1912)
Pelagodes clarifimbria (Prout, 1919)
Pelagodes cochlearis Holloway, 1996
Pelagodes flavifimbria (Warren, 1912)
Pelagodes forceps Holloway, 1996
Pelagodes furvifimbria (Prout, 1917)
Pelagodes maipoensis (Galsworthy, 1997)
Pelagodes ogasawarensis (Inoue, 1994)
Pelagodes proquadraria (Inoue, 1976)
Pelagodes rana Holloway, 1996
Pelagodes retusa (Prout, 1922)
Pelagodes rubellifrons (Warren, 1912)
Pelagodes semengok Holloway, 1996
Pelagodes semihyalina (Walker, 1861)
Pelagodes spiniseparati Holloway, 1996
Pelagodes subquadraria (Inoue, 1976)
Pelagodes subviridis (Warren, 1905)
Pelagodes tridens Holloway, 1996
Pelagodes veraria (Guenee, 1857)
Pelagodes viridicaput (Warren, 1897)
Pelagodes waterstradti Holloway, 1996

References
Natural History Museum Lepidoptera genus database

Hemitheini